Seth Griffith (born January 4, 1993) is a Canadian professional ice hockey forward who is currently playing with the Bakersfield Condors in the American Hockey League (AHL) while under contract to the Edmonton Oilers of the National Hockey League (NHL). He was selected by the Boston Bruins in the fifth round (131st overall) of the 2012 NHL Entry Draft.

Playing career
Griffith played major junior hockey with the London Knights of the Ontario Hockey League. With the team, he would win two consecutive OHL Championships and thus participate in two Memorial Cup tournaments. Griffith was rewarded for his outstanding play during the 2012–13 OHL season by being named to the OHL's First All-Star Team, one year after he was named to the Second All-Star team.

Griffith's first career NHL goal was scored on October 21, 2014 against San Jose Sharks's goaltender Antti Niemi.

Griffith dominated at the AHL level ever since debuting in 2013–14 season. Having recorded at nearly or over a point-a-game in all seasons since, he experienced a phenomenal 2015–16 campaign which saw him finish second in league scoring (as well as first in assists) and was named to the AHL First All-Star team. In total, he recorded 77 points in 57 games played. In reward for this, he was signed to a one-year, two-way contract extension on May 24, 2016.

On the eve of the 2016–17 season, Griffith was claimed off of waivers by the Toronto Maple Leafs on October 11, 2016, after he was placed on waivers the previous day. Leafs assistant general manager Mark Hunter and his team was responsible for the pick-up; Hunter have previously worked with Griffith within the London Knights organization. Griffith appeared in 3 games with the Maple Leafs, however largely served as a healthy scratch over the first month of the season. On November 12, 2016, Griffith's brief tenure with the Maple Leafs ended after he was again claimed off waivers, by the Florida Panthers. Griffith was inserted in the Panthers scoring line, however after a positive start, found a reduced role with 5 assists in 21 games. On January 19, 2017, Griffith was again placed on waivers and was re-claimed by the Maple Leafs for a second time. With the Leafs the only team vying for his services, Griffith was directly assigned to AHL affiliate, the Toronto Marlies on January 20, 2017. He would remain with the Marlies for the rest of the season, playing at a pace of over a point-per-game.

On July 1, 2017, Griffith signed a one-year, one-way $650,000 contract as a free agent with the Buffalo Sabres. Griffith made the Sabres opening night roster for the 2017–18 season, however was unable to take his opportunity, producing just 2 goals in 21 games in a depth role. He was assigned to AHL affiliate, the Rochester Americans, throughout the season, posting 41 points in 46 games.

As a free agent from the Sabres, Griffith joined the Winnipeg Jets on a one-year, two-way $650,000 contract on July 1, 2018.

After two seasons within the Jets organization playing primarily for AHL affiliate, the Manitoba Moose, Griffith left as a free agent and agreed to sign a two-year, two-way contract with the Edmonton Oilers on October 9, 2020.

Career statistics

Regular season and playoffs

International

Awards and honours

References

External links

1993 births
Living people
Bakersfield Condors players
Boston Bruins draft picks
Boston Bruins players
Buffalo Sabres players
Canadian ice hockey centres
Edmonton Oilers players
Florida Panthers players
Ice hockey people from Ontario
London Knights players
Manitoba Moose players
Providence Bruins players
Rochester Americans players
Sportspeople from Chatham-Kent
Toronto Maple Leafs players
Toronto Marlies players